"None of Us Are Free" is a rhythm and blues song written by Barry Mann, Cynthia Weil, and Brenda Russell in 1993.

It was first recorded by Ray Charles on his 1993 album My World, but received relatively little attention at that time. Noting that it is only one of five, "socially-conscious songs on the album," Jet describes the song as, "a piece that talks about the need for all people to get to know each other," and quotes Charles: "Music is powerful. As people listen to it, they can be affected. They respond. But when I was doing this album I wasn't trying to create an overall message. It just turned out that we got some songs that had something to say." Lynn Norment described the song as, "catchy," and that, like another album track, "One Drop of Love", it "deliver[s] pertinent social messages." Timothy White described the song as, "a hard-rolling exhortation...that deserves to be a multiformat radio anthem for these morally faltering times."<ref>White, Timothy (March 6, 1993). Music: To My Ears; Ray Charles' Brave New 'World'". Billboard, Vol. 105, No. 10, p.5. Nielsen Business Media. .</ref> Biographer Mike Evans described the song in 2009 as, "the main 'message' song on the album"

In 2002, a version was recorded by soul singer Solomon Burke on his album Don't Give Up On Me.  The track featured The Blind Boys of Alabama on backing vocals, and the album won the Grammy Award for Best Contemporary Blues Album, bringing Burke back into the public eye. The song was released as a single in the UK, and "None of Us Are Free" became a feature of Burke's later performances. His version of the track was notably featured at the end of the sixth episode of the second season of House. It is also used at the end of episode three season seven of Cold Case and at the end of the ninth episode in the first season of Snowfall. The magazine No Depression describes the song as, "funk-fortified," and, "a paean to justice through solidarity cowritten by Brill Building vets Barry Mann and Cynthia Weil," in which Burke, "admonishes on the chorus," while, "the Blind Boys of Alabama," intone, "implacably behind him." Lasczik Cutcher writes that the song, "reiterates this notion of our collective humanity, especially when suffering: that we ought to stand together."

In 2016, The Commissionaires released a version of the song as their debut single from their album Shelter Me. It was chosen as CBC Radio's Song Of The Week in Toronto, December 5, 2016.

The song has also been recorded by:
Chuck Negron: Am I Still in Your Heart? (1995)
Hiroshima: Urban World Music (1996)
Lynyrd Skynyrd: Twenty (1997)
Sam Moore: Overnight Sensational (2006)
Widespread Panic: Earth to Atlanta (2006)
Hanne Boel: Outtakes (2013/2014)
Michael English: Love is the Golden Rule (2017)
Sting and Sam Moore: Duets (2021)
Rain Perry and Betty Soo: A White Album'' (2022)

References

Solomon Burke songs
Ray Charles songs
Lynyrd Skynyrd songs
Songs written by Barry Mann
Songs with lyrics by Cynthia Weil
Songs written by Brenda Russell